Urophora sirunaseva is a species of tephritid or fruit flies in the genus Urophora of the family Tephritidae.

Distribution
Greece, Turkey, Moldova, Ukraine, Israel; introduced to North America

References

Urophora
Insects described in 1938
Diptera of Asia
Diptera of Europe